The 7th Congress of the Philippines (Filipino: Ikapitong Kongreso ng Pilipinas), composed of the Philippine Senate and House of Representatives, met from January 26, 1970, until September 23, 1972, during the fifth, sixth, and seventh years of Ferdinand Marcos's presidency. On September 23, 1972, President Marcos effectively dissolved the Congress with his declaration of martial law. Marcos then exercised legislative powers. In 1976, Congress was replaced by the Batasang Bayan as the Philippines' legislative body until 1978, when it was replaced by the Batasang Pambansa.

One-third of the Senate and the entire membership of the House of Representatives was replaced after the 1969 general elections. The House members and another third of the Senate membership were again replaced after the midterm senatorial elections of 1971.

Sessions
First Regular Session: January 26 – May 21, 1970
First Special Session: May 22 – June 25, 1970
Second Special Session: June 29 – August 1, 1970
Third Special Session: September 7 – October 10, 1970
Second Regular Session: January 25 – May 20, 1971
Fourth Special Session: June 14 – July 17, 1971
Fifth Special Session: August 2 – September 4, 1971
Third Regular Session: January 24 – May 18, 1972
Sixth Special Session: May 19 – June 21, 1972
Seventh Special Session: June 23 – July 27, 1972
Eighth Special Session: July 28 – August 31, 1972
Ninth Special Session: September 1 – 23, 1972

Legislation
The Seventh Congress in its three regular and six special sessions passed a total of 512 acts. Among it were:

Leadership

Senate

House of Representatives
Speaker:
Jose B. Laurel, Jr. (NP, 3rd District Batangas)
Cornelio T. Villareal (NP, 2nd District Capiz), elected April 1, 1971
Speaker Pro-Tempore:
Jose M. Aldeguer (NP, 5th District Iloilo)
Majority Floor Leader:
Marcelino Veloso (NP, 3rd District Leyte)
Minority Floor Leader:
Justiniano S. Montano (LP, Lone District Cavite)
Ramon V. Mitra, Jr. (LP, Lone District Palawan), elected June 12, 1971
Ramon Felipe, Jr. (LP, 1st District Camarines Sur), elected January 24, 1972

Members

Senate
The term of office of senators began December 30 following their election. One-third of the Senate was replaced, after the 1971 midterm elections. All terms that were scheduled to end after 1971 were cut short with the declaration of Martial Law.

House of Representatives
The term of office of the members of the House of Representatives was from December 30, 1969, to December 30, 1973, however was cut short with the declaration of Martial Law.

See also
Congress of the Philippines
Senate of the Philippines
House of Representatives of the Philippines
1969 Philippine general election
1971 Philippine general election

Further reading
Philippine House of Representatives Congressional Library

External links

07
Third Philippine Republic